Scopula guancharia is a moth of the  family Geometridae. It is found on the Canary Islands.

The wingspan is 23–24 mm. Adults are on wing nearly year round.

The larvae feed on various herbaceous plants, including Calendula species.

Subspecies
Scopula guancharia guancharia
Scopula guancharia illustris Pinker, 1968
Scopula guancharia mus Pinker, 1968
Scopula guancharia uniformis Pinker, 1968

References

Moths described in 1889
guancharia
Moths of Africa